The Communion of the Apostles, or Institution of the Eucharist is a painting of the Last Supper by Federico Barocci located at Santa Maria sopra Minerva in Rome. It was commissioned for the family chapel of Pope Clement VIII Aldobrandini and completed between 1603 and 1608.

It was most likely the sight of Barocci's Presentation of the Virgin in the Chiesa Nuova at its unveiling in 1603 that led to the commission of the Communion four months later. On 13 August 1603 the pope communicated with the minister to Francesco Maria II della Rovere, duke of Urbino, Giacomo Sorbolongo, about acquiring an altarpiece from Barocci. At this time the Cavaliere d'Arpino was the pope's most important artist; the letter goes on to ask that d'Arpino not be told of the commission.

The commission was completed entirely in Urbino and efforts were made to supply Barocci with extensive information about the contextual chapel, which was frescoed by Cherubino Alberti with a Triumph of the Holy Cross. Gian Pietro Bellori wrote that the pope was supplied with preparatory sketches. The pope sought the removal of Satan from the original design, and thereafter asked that it depict a night scene.

Barocci quotes from Raphael's School of Athens by inserting the portrait of Heraclitus, which many believe is a portrait of Michelangelo. Significantly, he depicts Judas Iscariot using Michelangelo's portrait. To an audience familiar with this association, this would have been taken as particularly strong commentary on the status of the Michelangelo. Furthermore, by directly quoting from Raphael, who was Michelangelo's antithesis and favoured by the Clementine church, Barocci, and by implication Pope Clement VIII, inserted a comment on the relative status of the two artists within the church of the time.

Barocci asked 1,500 scudi for the altarpiece. The fee undoubtedly was influenced by the number of figures. At the same point in his career (1604), he had accepted 300 scudi for a much simpler Crucifixion (Museo del Prado, Madrid).

Notes

References

1608 paintings
Paintings by Federico Barocci
Sacraments
Barocci
Angels in art
Altarpieces